This is a comprehensive listing of official releases by the British music act The Streets. The Streets released six studio albums, two mixtapes, one EP and twenty-nine singles.

The first studio album, Original Pirate Material, was released in the United Kingdom on 25 March 2002, and reached number 10 in the UK Albums Chart, managing to be certified as Platinum in March 2003. The second album, A Grand Don't Come for Free, was released in 2004, peaking at number 1 and certified thrice Platinum in the UK. The third studio album, The Hardest Way to Make an Easy Living, was released on 10 April 2006, becoming The Streets' second consecutive album to reach number one and certified as Gold several weeks after release. On 15 September 2008, the fourth studio album, Everything Is Borrowed, was released in the UK, becoming the fourth consecutive Top 10 album, peaking at number 7 and certified Silver two weeks after release. In 2011, he released two studio albums, Cyberspace and Reds billed as a mixtape and released through his website and the proper follow-up Computers and Blues.

Albums

Studio albums

Mixtapes

Extended plays

Singles

As lead artist

Promotional singles

Guest appearances

Remixes

Notes

References
	

Discographies of British artists
Hip hop discographies